Champagne Francis Pétret is a Champagne house founded in 1960 and based in Chouilly, near from Épernay.  The house, founded in 1988, produces both a blanc de blancs Chardonnay Champagne and a rosé

References

 Francis Petret on Wiki Champagne

External links
 Official website 

Champagne producers